Demetria Washington (born December 31, 1979) is an athlete who attended the University of South Carolina, graduating in 2003. She was a member of the US team that won at 2003 World Championships in Athletics – Women's 4 × 400 metres relay. She is known as a "sprinter" and was trained by Curtis Frye.

References 

1979 births
Living people
American female sprinters
South Carolina Gamecocks women's track and field athletes
Sportspeople from Fayetteville, North Carolina
World Athletics Championships medalists
Universiade medalists in athletics (track and field)
Universiade gold medalists for the United States
World Athletics Championships winners
Medalists at the 2001 Summer Universiade